Samuel J. Todd (January 19, 1821January 9, 1902) was an American lawyer and Republican politician.  He was an early settler of Beloit, Wisconsin, and was the 4th Mayor of Beloit.  He also represented Rock County in the Wisconsin State Senate for the 1867 and 1868 sessions.  His name is often abbreviated as S. J. Todd in historical documents.

Biography
Todd was born on January 19, 1821, in Preble, New York, son of Daniel and Mary Taggart Todd.  He studied law at Batavia, New York, and was admitted to the bar.

In 1850, he moved west and settled at Beloit, Wisconsin—then a small village.  He formed a law partnership with John M. Keep, which continued until Keep was appointed a Wisconsin circuit court judge in 1857.  Todd was one of the leading lawyers of Beloit for 30 years.

In 1857, Todd was one of three respected lawyers chosen by Governor Coles Bashford for a commission to revise and compile the statutes of Wisconsin, based on changes in the law since the previous edition.  He was partnered with David Taylor and Frederick S. Lovell.  The revised statutes were published in 1858, and later that year Todd was elected to a one-year term as Mayor of Beloit.

In 1866, Todd was elected to the Wisconsin State Senate, representing all of Rock County in what was then the 17th State Senate district.  He ran on the National Union Party ticket, but was identified with the Radical Republican faction of the time.  In the Senate, he served on the committee on incorporations in 1867, and served on judiciary, state affairs, and military affairs in 1868.

After leaving the Senate, he served as city attorney of Beloit from 1870 to 1874, and was a member of the school board from 1875 through 1885.

He suffered a stroke on January 7, 1902, and died two days later at his home in Beloit.

Personal life and family
Todd's ancestors were Scotch-Irish Americans.  He married Ms. Mary (or May) E. Hazard, of Essex County, New York, on December 21, 1853.  They had five children together, though one daughter died in infancy.  At the time of his death, only two of his children were still living.

References

External links
 

People from Cortland County, New York
Politicians from Beloit, Wisconsin
Republican Party Wisconsin state senators
Mayors of places in Wisconsin
Wisconsin city attorneys
19th-century American lawyers
School board members in Wisconsin
1821 births
1902 deaths
19th-century American politicians